Dominykas Jančionis (born 28 February 1993) is a Lithuanian rower.

In 2016 European championships he won silver with Lithuanian quadruple sculls team. He was also selected to the national team to represent Lithuania in 2016 Summer Olympics.

References

External links
 
 
 
 
 

1993 births
Living people
Lithuanian male rowers
Olympic rowers of Lithuania
Rowers at the 2016 Summer Olympics
Rowers at the 2020 Summer Olympics
European Rowing Championships medalists